Jack Cutmore-Scott (born 16 April 1987) is an English actor.
Born in London to two accountants, he spent a gap year at the London Academy of Music and Dramatic Art, and was involved in the Edinburgh Fringe Festival.

Cutmore-Scott was educated at Harvard University, where he studied English literature, languages, and theater. Cutmore-Scott started his acting career at the age of 20.

Career
Cutmore-Scott is prominently known for playing the title character in the television series Cooper Barrett's Guide to Surviving Life. He also played the role of Rufus Saville in the 2014 film Kingsman: The Secret Service.

As of March 11, 2018, Cutmore-Scott dons an American accent to play disgraced illusionist/magician-turned-FBI consultant Cameron Black following an illusion that goes horribly wrong in the new ABC murder-mystery series Deception. Cutmore-Scott also portrays Cameron's incarcerated, identical-twin brother Jonathan. Deception began airing the same evening in Canada on CTV.

To prepare for the roles in Deception Cutmore-Scott worked with magicians David Kwong and Francis Menotti to learn how to perform the magic tricks on the show.

In 2023, he was cast in the upcoming Paramount+ revival of the classic sitcom Frasier'', playing Frasier Crane's son, Frederick "Freddy" Crane.

Filmography

Film

Television

References

External links
 

1987 births
English male film actors
English male television actors
English expatriates in the United States
Living people
Male actors from London
Harvard University alumni
21st-century English male actors